Hot Stuff is the seventh studio album by La Mafia released on August 24, 1984. It entered at number twenty-five on the Billboard Latin Regional chart.

Track listing

References

1984 albums
La Mafia albums
Spanish-language albums
Tejano Music Award winners for Album of the Year